= Ness Monsters AFC =

Ness Monsters

General information
- Founded: 1986
- Folded: 1990
- Stadium: Telford Street Park (1987); Bught Park, Inverness (1988–1989 and 2000–2003)
- Headquartered: Inverness, Scotland

Uniform

Primary

The Ness Monsters were an American football team from the north of Scotland who were based in Inverness. The team was named after the Loch Ness Monster and the Monsters played in Grey and Green.

The team was founded in October 1986 and played in their first game against the Clydesdale Colts in early 1987 where the team lost 66-0. Later that years they joined the BAFA Thistle League where they played their first regular season game on 19 April against the Capital Clansmen at Telford Street Park, Inverness. The club played competitive American football up until 1989.

== 1987 Season ==
Ness Monsters Results
Ness Monster 44-0 Capital Clansmen (H) 19 April 1987
Strathmore Scorpions 30-12 Ness Monsters (A) 3 May 1987
Ness Monsters 36-6 Barrhead Redhawks (H) 17 May 1987
Dundee Whalers 44-6 Ness Monsters (A) 24 May 1987
Fife 49ers 68-30 Ness Monsters (A) 31 May 1987
Ness Monsters 22-32 Strathmore Scorpions (H) 14 June 1987
Capital Clansmen 30-32 Ness Monsters (A) 21 June 1987
Ness Monsters 24-52 Dundee Whalers (H) 12 July 1987
Barrhead Redhawks 6-32 Ness Monsters (A) 2 August 1987
Ness Monsters 44-0 Fife 49ers (H) 9 August 1987
Thistle League Table

Team name	W	L	T	PF	PA
Dundee Whalers	10	0	0	453	93
Fife 49ers	7	3	0	297	181
Strathmore Scorpions	6	4	0	196	156
Ness Monsters	5	5	0	252	268
Barrhead Redhawks	1	8	1	62	325
Capital Clansmen	0	9	1	100	337

== 1988 Season ==
Ness Monsters Results

Ness Monsters 8-29 Strathclyde Sheriffs

Ness Monsters 12-13 Glasgow Diamonds

Ness Monsters 112-6 Inverclyde Comets

Ness Monsters 14-0 Strathmore Scorpions

Ness Monsters 14-28 Forth Valley Generals

Ness Monsters 24-6 Capital Clansmen

Ness Monsters 28-6 Glasgow Diamonds

Ness Monsters 6-22 Strathclyde Sheriffs

Ness Monsters 18-0 Capital Clansmen

Ness Monsters 24-6 Strathmore Scorpions

Caledonian Bowl Ness Monsters 12-46 Strathclyde Sheriffs

Caledonian American Football League Table

Team name	W	L	T	PF	PA
Strathclyde Sheriffs	10	0	0	284	17
Ness Monsters	6	4	0	260	116
Glasgow Diamonds	6	4	0	208	132
Forth Valley Generals	6	4	0	166	137
Strathmore Scorpions	4	5	1	91	139
Capital Clansmen	4	5	1	136	141
Inverclyde Comets	0	10	0	26	466

== 1989 Season ==
Ness Monsters Results

Ness Monsters 6-6 Forth Valley Generals

Ness Monsters 1-0 Livingston Chieftains

Ness Monsters 16-14 Livingston Chieftains

Ness Monsters 8-22 Forth Valley Generals

! Team name	W	L	T	PF	PA
Forth Valley Generals	4	0	0	89	14
Ness Monsters	2	1	1	30	42
Livingston Chieftains	0	4	0	14	77

== 2000 Return ==
After an 11-year wait the Ness Monsters played their last ever games of American Football against the Fort William Phoenix before bowing out of the sport altogether.

The results of these games are as follows:

Fort William Phoenix 50-0 Ness Monsters

December 2000

Ness Monsters 0-36 Fort William Phoenix

28 January 2001
